The California Institute for Yiddish Culture and Language (CYCL) started in 1999 and serves as a multi-generational center for the teaching, promotion, celebration and learning of Yiddish in all of its embodiments, with an emphasis on the arts and other areas that influence the cultural formations that inform its existence.  The institute owes its establishment to Miriam Koral, who is the Founding Director, and who, as a Yiddish instructor at UCLA and native Yiddish speaker, created the center and community that brings world-renowned Yiddish authors, playwrights, musicians, poets, artists and others to the Los Angeles area.

See also
 Yiddishkeit

References

External links
 California Institute for Yiddish Culture and Language

Ashkenazi Jewish culture in Los Angeles
Jewish organizations based in the United States
Jewish theatre
Yiddish culture in the United States
Yiddish-language literature
Yiddish theatre in the United States
Cultural infrastructure completed in 1999
1999 establishments in California